Line Kjørsvik  (born December 29, 1975) is a Norwegian pool player. Kjørsvik is a regular player for the WPBA-Tour in America. At the European Pool Championships Kjørsvik has won six championships.  At the World Games 2005 she won the bronze medal in the Nine-ball event, reaching the semi-final.  At the WPA Women's World Nine-ball Championship, Kjørsvik reached her best position in 2006 reaching the quarter-finals. In addition, she is 35 times Norwegian pool champion.

Kjørsvik is also a successful player on the Euro Tour, where she has won two events at the 2005 Italian Open, and the 2004 Dutch Open.

External links 

 Line Kjørsvik auf der Website der European Pocket Billiard Federation

References 

1975 births
Norwegian sportswomen
Living people
Female pool players
World Games bronze medalists
20th-century Norwegian women
21st-century Norwegian women